Metal–inorganic frameworks (MIFs) are a class of compounds consisting of metal ions or clusters coordinated to inorganic ligands to form one-, two-, or three-dimensional structures.  They are a subclass of coordination polymers, with the special feature that they are often porous. They are inorganic counterpart of Metal–organic frameworks.

History 
Millon's base which have been known since early 20th century, can be considered as MIFs.

Linkers 
MIF with Borazocine linker was developed for hydrogen storage.  Cu2I2Se6 has Se6 linkers. There are many MIFs with pnictogen linkers.

References 

Crystal engineering
Porous media
Coordination polymers
Inorganic compounds